Triadica cochinchinensis is a species of tree known as the mountain tallow tree.

The seeds (as well as from those of Triadica sebifera) are the sources of stillingia oil, a drying oil used in paints and varnishes. The fatty coat of the seeds is known as stillingia tallow, hence its common name.

The two species were formerly classified in the genus Stillingia, as Stillingia discolor and Stillingia sebifera (hence the name of the oil and tallow).  At some time before 1950, this tree was reclassified into the genus Sapium as Sapium discolor. In 2002 or so it was reclassified again into the genus Triadica with its present name.

Synonyms
The following synonyms and former names have been listed for Triadica cochinchinensis:

 Excoecaria loureiroana 
 Sapium cochinchinense 
 Shirakia cochinchinensis 
 Stillingia discolor 
 Sapium discolor 
 Excoecaria discolor 
 Stillingia ? lanceolaria 
 Excoecaria ? lanceolaria 
 Sapium eugeniaefolium 
 Sapium laui

References

Hippomaneae